The State is a four-part British television drama serial, written and directed by Peter Kosminsky, that dramatises the experiences of four young British Muslims who fly to Syria to join Islamic State. The series was originally broadcast in the UK by Channel 4, with all four parts airing on successive nights between 20 and 23 August 2017. The series was green-lit in July 2016, following extensive research by Kosminsky.

Ony Uhiara, Sam Otto, Shavani Cameron and Ryan McKen were later cast as the four principal characters, Shakira, Jalal, Ushna and Ziyad. Most of the series's location filming was undertaken in Spain later that autumn. The series was broadcast worldwide by National Geographic, airing in Australia from 23 August, and premiering in the United States as a two-night special event on 18 and 19 September, In France, the series was broadcast by Canal+ from 4 September. The series was released on DVD in the United States on 28 November 2017.

Reception
The first episode was watched live by 1.4 million viewers, which was described by Broadcast magazine as a "solid start". However, Channel 4 is unlikely to make money from the series; according to outgoing chief creative officer Jay Hunt, the channel needs to cross-subsidise such dramas with more populist programmes such as Great British Bake Off. The figure increased to 2.33 million taking into account catch-up viewing over the next seven days, and 2.49 million after a month.

The series was widely praised by viewers and critics.  The Guardian wrote that "this Isis drama is ... gripping and genuinely enlightening", and The Telegraph noted that "viewers on Twitter praised its stars and creators for 'capturing how barbaric and evil ISIS are'." Before the drama aired, Richard Kemp, a former advisor to the UK government on counter-terrorism, warned that it would be a "recruiting sergeant" for ISIS, a view prominently reported by several tabloid newspapers. However, the idea that the drama made ISIS glamorous or attractive was rejected by most reviewers.

Most reviewers found the drama powerful, immersive, and compelling, with both its direction and acting widely praised.  However, many questioned the portrayal of the protagonists' apparent initial ignorance and naivety, and of their subsequent antipathy to brutality and hatred, and doubted that either were representative of real jihadis. Although a few references were made to IS's online engagement and misinformation, the decision not to present detailed back-stories for the characters led some critics to suggest that the series failed to explore why people might become radicalised, and that such apparently reasonable people would never have gone to Syria to support it. On the other hand, as former Conservative minister Baroness Warsi commented, "There are many proud parents who cannot understand why their children find an affiliation with Isil... So often we have lazily defined those attracted to violent ideologies promulgated in far-off countries as mad, bad misfits and yet the reality is far more complicated."

Cast

Main cast
 Ony Uhiara as Shakira Boothe; a British doctor and single mother to nine-year-old Isaac who travels to Syria in the hope of working in a state hospital.
 Sam Otto as Jalal Hossein; a teenager who follows his deceased elder brother to Syria, wanting to understand what he had experienced.
 Shavani Cameron as Ushna Kaleel; a teenager seeking to be a "lioness for lions".
 Ryan McKen as Ziyad Kader; Jalal's closest friend, who accompanies him hoping for adventure.

Supporting cast
 Hiam Abbass as Umm Salamah; educator and spiritual leader
 Jessica Gunning as Umm Walid; leader of the new arrivals house
 Nana Agyeman-Bediako as Isaac Boothe; Shakira's nine-year-old son
 Ali Suliman as Abu Omar; Jalal and Ziyad's unit commander
 Haaz Sleiman as Dr. Rabia; a colleague of Shakira's
 Amir El-Masry as Sayed; a Syrian pharmacist and suspected CIA spy
 Nitin Ganatra as Munir Hossein; Jalal's estranged father
 Yannick de Waal as Abu Abbas Al-Hollandi
 Yasen Atour as Abu Issa
 Samer Bisharat as Abu Sahl
 Karim Kassem as Abu Akram
 Sebastian Griegel as Abu Lut Al-Almani 
 Jack Greenlees as Abu Ibrahim Al-Brittani
 Charles Mnene as Abu Ayoub Al-Brittani 
 Fayez Bakhsh as Abu Jihad Al-Brittani
 Zafer El-Abedin as Maqqir Amir

Episodes

References

External links
 
 Teaser trailer, YouTube
 National Geographic trailer, YouTube

Films directed by Peter Kosminsky
2010s British drama television series
2017 British television series debuts
2017 British television series endings
Works about the Islamic State of Iraq and the Levant
Channel 4 original programming
National Geographic (American TV channel)
2010s British television miniseries